Zero to Sixty is a 1977 American comedy film directed by Don Weis and starring Darren McGavin, Sylvia Miles, Joan Collins, Denise Nickerson, and Dick Martin. The film was released on June 23, 1978 and was later reviewed by TV Guide, which called Darren McGavin "fun to watch" in the film, but noted the premise was brought to the screen six years later in a different film, Repo Man. This film was Denise Nickerson's last acting performance before her retirement and her death in 2019.

Plot
Michael Nolan (McGavin) finds himself down on his luck following his divorce settlement, which has left him with nothing. During the repossession of his car, he makes chase all the way to the auto repossession company. His persistence impresses the owner, who hires him on the spot. Nolan is then teamed up with Larry, a 16-year-old experienced repo agent. As Nolan settles into his new career, he continually finds himself troubled by women, angry car owners, and more.

Cast
Darren McGavin as Michael Nolan
Sylvia Miles as Flo Ames
Joan Collins as Gloria Martine
Denise Nickerson as 'Larry' Wilde
Dick Martin as Arthur Dunking
Bill Hudson as Eddie
Brett Hudson as Harry
Mark Hudson as Sammy
Vito Scotti as Benny
Lorraine Gary as Billy-Jon
David Huddleston as Harold Finch
Gordon MacRae as Officer Joe
Lyle Waggoner as Gay Bar Bartender

References

External links
 
 
 
 

1970s English-language films
1977 films
1977 comedy films
American comedy films
First Artists films
Films about automobiles
1970s American films